The 2016 CAA women's soccer tournament is the postseason women's soccer tournament for the Colonial Athletic Association to be held from October 30 to November 6, 2016. The five match tournament will be held at campus sites, with the semifinals and final held at Parsons Field in Brookline, Massachusetts. The six team single-elimination tournament will consist of three rounds based on seeding from regular season conference play. The James Madison Dukes are the defending tournament champions after defeating the William & Mary Tribe in the championship match.

Bracket

Schedule

First round

Semifinals

Final

References 
2016 CAA Women's Soccer Championship

Colonial Athletic Association women's soccer tournament
2016 Colonial Athletic Association women's soccer season